, abbrev. D.I.N.G.K.Z.O., is a compilation album by The Gazette, featuring all songs of their previously released EPs Cockayne Soup, Akuyuukai and Spermargarita on one disc.

Track listing

Notes
"Shiawase na Hibi" and "Wife" are re-recordings of songs featured on the Gozen 0-ji no Trauma Radio single, released in 2002.
"Wakaremichi" is a re-recording of the initial track from the Wakaremichi single, also released in 2002.

Personnel 
 Ruki – vocals
 Uruha – guitar, backing vocals
 Aoi – guitar, backing vocals
 Reita – bass guitar, backing vocals
 Kai – drums, backing vocals

2006 compilation albums
The Gazette (band) albums